Azteca coussapoae is a species of ant in the genus Azteca. Described by Forel in 1905, the species is endemic to Brazil.

References

Azteca (genus)
Hymenoptera of South America
Insects described in 1904